Monster Coliseum is a tabletop role-playing game supplement for RuneQuest published by Avalon Hill in 1985. Monster Coliseum adapted gladiatorial types and coliseum combat procedures to the RuneQuest rules. Although published by Avalon Hill, the contents are copyright Chaosium, while RuneQuest was a trademark of Avalon Hill. Written by Steve Perrin, Dan Nolte, and Sandy Petersen, with a cover by Lisa Free, and art by Kevin Ramos.

Publication history
The first of Avalon Hill's boxed supplements for their third edition of RuneQuest. An updated version was published in 2010 by Mongoose Publishing for RuneQuest II .

Contents
Derived from Roman examples, Monster Coliseum uses the Roman Coliseum as the model for gladitorial combat, combat versus various beasts, and chariot races for RuneQuest campaigns. This information is divided into three books:
 48-page "Coliseum Book"
 40-page "Monster Book" provides descriptions of various real and fictional beasts
 16-page book of play aids
 sections of chariot track (using a 5 mm scale)
 a wargaming range stick
 a large map containing a coliseum floorplan (using 15 mm scale)

The 2010 book  The 186-page hardcover book was written by Lawrence Whitaker, with artwork by Nick Egberts, Olivier Frot, Danilo Ariel Guida, Kiriko Moth, John Kohlepp, Alejandro Lizaur Gutiérrez, Esther 'Sanz' Muñoz, Pedro Potier, Jean-Michel Ringuet, Sean Thornton, and Robin Wallin. It also contained additional suggestions for integration with the Elric of Melniboné, and  Hawkmoon fantasy settings.

 Introduction
 Arena
 Amphitheatres & Coliseums
 Monsters Introduction
 Humans & Humanoids
 Arachnids & Insects
 Dinosaurs & Reptiles
 Creatures of Legend
 Mammals
 The Mean Arena
 Index of Beasts

Reception
Oliver Dickinson reviewed Monster Coliseum for White Dwarf #67, giving it an overall rating of 6 out of 10, and stated that "Unlike a scenario, coliseum combats and chariot races can be staged many times, but despite this, the potential interest of the chariot racing, and the individual features of general use, I cannot see that the high price is fully justified by the contents particularly when so much of the Monsters Book essentially repeats what is already available to GM's."

Other recognition
A copy of Monster Coliseum is held in the collection of the Strong National Museum of Play (object 110.24960).

References

Role-playing game supplements introduced in 1985
RuneQuest 3rd edition supplements